Pedro Moraes Trindade, commonly known as Mestre Moraes, (born February 9, 1950 in Ilha de Maré in Salvador, Brazil) is a master of capoeira.

Moraes began his training in Capoeira de Angola at the age of eight. His father was also a Capoeirista, or practitioner of Capoeira Angola, the traditional style of Capoeira in Bahia, Brazil.

At the time he began studying capoeira in the 1950s, he trained at the academy of Vicente Ferreira Pastinha. However, by that time Pastinha was blind with and no longer taught classes. The academy was run by Pastinha's students João Grande and João Pequeno, who taught classes.  He states that he is truly the student of João Grande due to the impression made on the young Moraes by the inspiring way that João Grande played capoeira.

In 1970, while in the employ of the Brazilian military, he left Salvador for Rio de Janeiro, where he stayed for twelve years. To preserve and transmit his mentors' teachings, he founded Grupo Capoeira Angola Pelourinho (GCAP) in 1980, and two years later he moved with his organisation back to Salvador. His aim was to return to capoeira's philosophical bases and its African, specifically Angolan roots, and to turn away from the more commercial and martial-arts aspects.

Moraes is a strong advocate of the Angola style of capoeira, and believes that the source of capoeira is the n'golo, or 'zebra dance', a ritual combat performed by young warriors in southwestern Angola.

He codified the Angolan musical style, and defined its basic instrumental ensemble, and requires GCAP's members to be versed in all aspects of capoeira Angola's music.

Moraes has stated his idea of capoeira Angola's basic philosophy: "The capoeira ring, whose geometric form facilitates the propagation of energy, is one of the symbolic representations of the 'macro' world. The movements we make inside this ring symbolise the adversities we encounter in life, which we often don't know how to deal with. In the game of life, our opponents, in most cases, know nothing of capoeira, but have movements peculiar to their own game, which we should be able to interpret and understand in their context, taking the capoeira ring as a point of reference. Playing in the ring, we succeed in establishing a fusion between playful elements and respect for the other person. But the ring isn't reality: the world is. If we win in this ring, we can take the other one too!"

Moraes lives in Salvador, Bahia, where he divides his time between teaching English and Portuguese at a public school, and directing GCAP which now exists as more of a cultural outreach project which trains older visiting students as well as children who would otherwise not have a direction in which to put their energies.

He is the teacher of Cinézio Feliciano Peçanha. They parted ways in the 1990s over organizational differences.

Lineage

References 
 https://web.archive.org/web/20041012163208/http://www.gcap-manchester.org.uk/moraes/moraes.html
 https://web.archive.org/web/20070622041317/http://www.gcap.org.br/historia.htm
 https://web.archive.org/web/20141218152428/http://acca-manchester.org.uk/

Capoeira mestres
1950 births
Living people
Afro-Brazilian people